Phantom pain is a perception that an individual experiences relating to a limb or an organ that is not physically part of the body, either because it was removed or was never there in the first place. However, phantom limb sensations can also occur following nerve avulsion or spinal cord injury.

Sensations are recorded most frequently following the amputation of an arm or a leg, but may also occur following the removal of a breast, tooth, or an internal organ. Phantom limb pain is the feeling of pain in an absent limb or a portion of a limb. The pain sensation varies from individual to individual.

Phantom limb sensation is any sensory phenomenon (except pain) which is felt at an absent limb or a portion of the limb. It has been known that at least 80% of amputees experience phantom sensations at some time of their lives.  Some experience some level of this phantom pain and feeling in the missing limb for the rest of their lives.

The term "phantom limb" was first coined by American neurologist Silas Weir Mitchell in 1871. Mitchell described that "thousands of spirit limbs were haunting as many good soldiers, every now and then tormenting them". However, in 1551, French military surgeon Ambroise Paré recorded the first documentation of phantom limb pain when he reported that, "For the patients, long after the amputation is made, say that they still feel pain in the amputated part".

Signs and symptoms
Phantom pain involves the sensation of pain in a part of the body that has been removed.

The onset of phantom pain can occur within the first few days of amputation. The sensation may come and go, but can be continuous. While the sensation often affects the part of the limb farthest from the body, such as the foot of an amputated leg, other body parts closer to the brain, such as the arm or hand, can still experience similar sensations. Sensations can be described as shooting, stabbing, boring, squeezing, throbbing or burning.  Sensations on smaller limbs and digits such as toes or fingers tend to be less severe.  Sometimes the sensation feels as if the phantom part is forced into an uncomfortable position. Overall, the sensations may be triggered by pressure on the remaining part of the limb or emotional stress.

Types
There are various types of sensations that may be felt:

Sensations related to the phantom limb's posture, length and volume e.g. feeling that the phantom limb is behaving just like a normal limb like sitting with the knee bent or feeling that the phantom limb is as heavy as the other limb. Sometimes, an amputee will experience a sensation called telescoping, the feeling that the phantom limb is gradually shortening over time.
Sensations of movement (e.g. feeling that the phantom foot is moving).
Sensations of touch, temperature, pressure and itchiness. Many amputees report of feeling heat, tingling, itchiness, and pain.
In less severe cases where small digits are amputated, the sensation can be described as a tingling feeling as opposed to a painful sensation.

Pathophysiology
The neurological basis and mechanisms for phantom limb pain are all derived from experimental theories and observations. Little is known about the true mechanism causing phantom pains, and many theories highly overlap. Historically, phantom pains were thought to originate from neuromas located at the stump tip. Traumatic neuromas, or non-tumor nerve injuries, often arise from surgeries and result from the abnormal growth of injured nerve fibers. Although stump neuromas contribute to phantom pains, they are not the sole cause. This is because patients with congenital limb deficiency can sometimes, although rarely, experience phantom pains. This suggests that there is a central representation of the limb responsible for painful sensations. Currently, theories are based on altered neurological pathways and cortical reorganization.

Peripheral mechanisms
Neuromas formed from injured nerve endings at the stump site are able to fire abnormal action potentials, and were historically thought to be the main cause of phantom limb pain. Although neuromas are able to contribute to phantom pain, pain is not completely eliminated when peripheral nerves are treated with conduction blocking agents. Physical stimulation of neuromas can increase C fiber activity, thus increasing phantom pain, but pain still persists once the neuromas have ceased firing action potentials. The peripheral nervous system is thought to have at most a modulation effect on phantom limb pain.

Spinal mechanisms
In addition to peripheral mechanisms, spinal mechanisms are thought to have an influencing role in phantom pains. Peripheral nerve injury can lead to the degeneration of C fibers in the dorsal horn of the spinal cord, and terminating A fibers may subsequently branch into the same lamina. If this occurs, A fiber inputs could be reported as noxious stimuli. Substance P, involved in the transmission of pain signals, is usually expressed by Aδ and C fibers, but following peripheral nerve damage, substance P is expressed by Aβ fibers. This leads to hyperexcitability of the spinal cord, which usually occurs only in the presence of noxious stimuli. Because patients with complete spinal cord injury have experienced phantom pains, there must be an underlying central mechanism responsible for the generation of phantom pains.

Central mechanisms
Under ordinary circumstances, the genetically determined circuitry in the brain remains largely stable throughout life. For much of the twentieth century, it was believed that no new neural circuits could be formed in the adult mammalian brain, but experiments from the 1980s onward cast this into doubt. For instance, functional MRI studies in amputees have shown that almost all patients have experienced motor cortical remapping. The majority of motor reorganization has occurred as a downward shift of the hand area of the cortex onto the area of face representation, especially the lips. Sometimes there is a side shift of the hand motor cortex to the ipsilateral cortex. In patients with phantom limb pain, the reorganization was great enough to cause a change in cortical lip representation into the hand areas only during lip movements. It has also been found that there is a high correlation between the magnitude of phantom limb pain and the extent to which the shift of the cortical representation of the mouth into the hand area in motor and somatosensory cortical reorganization has occurred. Additionally, as phantom pains in upper extremity amputees increased, there was a higher degree of medial shift of the facial motor representation. There are multiple theories that try to explain how cortical remapping occurs in amputees, but none have been supported to a great extent.

The neuromatrix
The neuromatrix theory proposes that there is an extensive network connecting the thalamus and the cortex, and the cortex and the limbic system. It is a theory that extends beyond body schema theory and incorporates the conscious awareness of oneself. This theory proposes that conscious awareness and the perception of self are generated in the brain via patterns of input that can be modified by different perceptual inputs. The network is genetically predetermined, and is modified throughout one’s lifetime by various sensory inputs to create a neurosignature. It is the neurosignature of a specific body part that determines how it is consciously perceived. The input systems contributing to the neurosignature are primarily the somatosensory, limbic, and thalamocortical systems. The neuromatrix theory aims to explain how certain activities associated with pain lead to the conscious perception of phantom pain. The persistence of the neurosignature, even after limb amputation, may be the cause of phantom sensations and pain. Phantom pain may arise from abnormal reorganization in the neuromatrix to a pre-existing pain state.

Opposition to the neuromatrix theory exists largely because it fails to explain why relief from phantom sensations rarely eliminates phantom pains. It also does not address how sensations can spontaneously end and how some amputees do not experience phantom sensations at all. In addition, a major limitation of the neuromatrix theory is that it too broadly accounts for various aspects of phantom limb perception. It is also likely that it is too difficult to be tested empirically, especially when testing painless phantom sensations.

Management
Various methods have been used to treat phantom limb pain. Doctors may prescribe medications to reduce the pain. Some antidepressants or antiepileptics have been shown to have a beneficial effect on reducing phantom limb pain. Often physical methods such as light massage, electrical stimulation, and hot and cold therapy have been used with variable results.

There are many different treatment options for phantom limb pain that are actively being researched. Most treatments do not take into account the mechanisms underlying phantom pains, and are therefore ineffective. However, there are a few treatment options that have been shown to alleviate pain in some patients, but these treatment options usually have a success rate less than 30%. It is important to note that this rate of success does not exceed the placebo effect. It is also important to note that because the degree of cortical reorganization is proportional to phantom limb pains, any perturbations to the amputated regions may increase pain perception.

Mirror therapy

Mirror box therapy allows for illusions of movement and touch in a phantom limb by inducing somatosensory and motor pathway coupling between the phantom and real limb. Many patients experience pain as a result of a clenched phantom limb, and because phantom limbs are not under voluntary control, unclenching becomes impossible. This theory proposes that the phantom limb feels paralyzed because there is no feedback from the phantom back to the brain to inform it otherwise. Vilayanur S. Ramachandran believes that if the brain received visual feedback that the limb had moved, then the phantom limb would become unparalyzed.

Although the use of mirror therapy has been shown to be effective in some cases there is still no widely accepted theory of how it works. According to 2017 paper that reviewed a wide range of studies of mirror therapy, "Research evidence suggests that a course of treatment (four weeks) of mirror therapy may reduce chronic pain. Contraindications and side effects are few. The mechanism of action of mirror therapy remains uncertain, with reintegration of motor and sensory systems, restored body image and control over fear-avoidance likely to influence outcome. The evidence for clinical efficacy of mirror therapy is encouraging, but not yet definitive. Nevertheless, mirror therapy is inexpensive, safe and easy for the patient to self-administer."

Little research was published on MT before 2009, and much of the research since then has been of low quality. Out of 115 publications between 2012 and 2017 about using mirror therapy to treat phantom limb pain, a 2018 review, found only 15 studies whose scientific results should be considered. From these 15 studies, the reviewers concluded that "MT seems to be effective in relieving PLP, reducing the intensity and duration of daily pain episodes. It is a valid, simple, and inexpensive treatment for PLP."

Medication
Pharmacological techniques are often continued in conjunction with other treatment options. Doses of pain medications needed often drop substantially when combined with other techniques, but rarely are discontinued completely. Tricyclic antidepressants, such as amitriptyline, and sodium channel blockers, mainly carbamazepine, are often used to relieve chronic pain, and recently have been used in an attempt to reduce phantom pains. Pain relief may also be achieved through use of opioids, ketamine, calcitonin, and lidocaine.

Deep-brain stimulation
Deep brain stimulation is a surgical technique used to alleviate patients from phantom limb pain. Prior to surgery, patients undergo functional brain imaging techniques such as PET scans and functional MRI to determine an appropriate trajectory of where pain is originating. Surgery is then carried out under local anesthetic, because patient feedback during the operation is needed. In the study conducted by Bittar et al., a radiofrequency electrode with four contact points was placed on the brain. Once the electrode was in place, the contact locations were altered slightly according to where the patient felt the greatest relief from pain. Once the location of maximal relief was determined, the electrode was implanted and secured to the skull. After the primary surgery, a secondary surgery under general anesthesia was conducted. A subcutaneous pulse generator was implanted into a pectoral pocket below the clavicle to stimulate the electrode. It was found that all three patients studied had gained satisfactory pain relief from the deep brain stimulation. Pain had not been completely eliminated, but the intensity had been reduced by over 50% and the burning component had completely vanished.

Epidemiology
Phantom limb pain and phantom limb sensations are linked, but must be differentiated from one another. While phantom limb sensations are experienced by those with congenital limb deficiency, spinal cord injury, and amputation, phantom limb pain occurs almost exclusively as a result of amputation. Almost immediately following the amputation of a limb, 90–98% of patients report experiencing a phantom sensation. Nearly 75% of individuals experience the phantom as soon as anesthesia wears off, and the remaining 25% of patients experience phantoms within a few days or weeks. Of those experiencing innocuous sensations, a majority of patients also report distinct painful sensations.

Age and gender have not been shown to affect the onset or duration of phantom limb pain. Although it has not been fully explored, one investigation of lower limb amputation observed that as stump length decreased, there was a greater incidence of moderate and severe phantom pain.

See also
 Phantom limb
 Phantom eye syndrome

References

External links 

Targeted Muscle Reinnervation

Pain

de:Phantomschmerz
fr:Membre fantôme
pt:Dor do membro fantasma